Ust-Olenyok (Uus Ölöön / Istaannaax) is a rural locality (a selo), the only inhabited locality, and the administrative center of Ystannakhsky Rural Okrug of Bulunsky District in the Sakha Republic, Russia, located  from Tiksi, the administrative center of the district. Its population as of the 2010 Census was 27, down from 52 recorded during the 2002 Census.

Geography
The settlement is located on the slope of a low hill, by the right bank of the mouth of the Olenyok River.

History
The first settlement was a wintering hut built in 1633 near the modern village. It served as the administrative center of the desolate area and it was used by Arctic expeditions in different occasions in history.

Climate
Ust-Olenyok has a tundra climate (ET) with short, cool summers and long, severely cold winters. On June 30th, 2020 the temperature soared to 93.7 °F (34.3 °C) which may be the farthest north above 90 °F (32.2 °C) recorded above the 72 °N parallel. The following morning the temperature only dropped to 72.7 °F (22.6 °C).

References

Notes

Sources
Official website of the Sakha Republic. Registry of the Administrative-Territorial Divisions of the Sakha Republic. Bulunsky District. 

Rural localities in Bulunsky District
Olenyok basin
